The Memorandum of Understanding on the Conservation and Management of Marine Turtles and their Habitats of the Indian Ocean and South-East Asia is an intergovernmental agreement that aims to protect, conserve, replenish and recover sea turtles and their habitats in the Indian Ocean and South-East Asian region, working in partnership with other relevant actors and organizations.

Major threats to marine turtles include unsustainable exploitation, destruction of nesting and feeding habitats, and incidental mortality in fishing operations. The Conservation and Management Plan—containing 24 programs and 105 specific activities—focuses on reducing threats, conserving critical habitat, exchanging scientific data, increasing public awareness and participation, promoting regional cooperation, and seeking resources for implementation.

The MoU was concluded in Bonn, Germany on 23 June 2001 and came into effect on 1 September 2001. The intent is that it will remain open for signature indefinitely.

Territory
Waters and coastal states of the Indian Ocean and South-East Asia and adjacent seas, extending eastwards to the Torres Strait. For implementation purposes, the area is divided into four sub-regions: South-East Asia + neighbours, Northern Indian Ocean, Northwestern Indian Ocean, and Western Indian Ocean. States, located on the territory of the Agreement, are the following:  Australia, Bahrain, Bangladesh, Brunei Darussalam, Cambodia, China, Comores, Djibouti, Egypt, Eritrea, France, India, Indonesia, Islamic Republic of Iran, Japan, Jordan, Kenya, Kuwait, Madagascar, Malaysia, Maldives, Mauritius, Mozambique, Myanmar, Oman, Pakistan, Papua New Guinea, Philippines, Qatar, Republic of Korea, Saudi Arabia, Seychelles, Singapore, Somalia, South Africa, Sri Lanka, Sudan, Thailand, Timor Leste, United Arab Emirates, United Republic of Tanzania, United Kingdom, Vietnam, Yemen. The United States of America also participated in the Memorandum of Understanding.

Signatories
As of May 2013, 33 states have signed the memorandum. The list of the countries is found below with the dates of the signature in the parentheses:
Australia (23 June 2001)
Bahrain (10 December 2006)
Bangladesh (23 October 2003)
Cambodia (12 December 2002)
Comoros (23 June 2001)
Eritrea (24 November 2005)
France (5 December 2008)
India (20 February 2007)
Indonesia (31 March 2005)
Islamic Republic of Iran (23 June 2001)
Jordan (18 March 2004)
Kenya (9 May 2002)
Madagascar (22 January 2003)
Malaysia (19 September 2011)
Maldives (26 April 2010)
Mauritius (12 July 2002)
Mozambique (5 December 2008)
Myanmar (23 June 2001)
Oman (16 March 2004)
Pakistan (12 July 2004)
Papua New Guinea (10 September 2010)
Philippines (23 June 2001)
Saudi Arabia (3 August 2005)
Seychelles (22 January 2003)
South Africa (22 February 2005)
Sri Lanka (23 June 2001)
Thailand (12 May 2004)
United Arab Emirates (18 January 2007)
United Kingdom (27 March 2002)
United Republic of Tanzania (23 June 2001)
United States of America (23 June 2001)
Viet Nam (24 July 2001)
Yemen (1 November 2008)

Species protected
The turtle species currently protected by the memorandum are:
Loggerhead turtle, Caretta caretta
Olive ridley turtle, Lepidochelys olivacea
Green turtle, Chelonia mydas
Hawksbill turtle, Eretmochelys imbricata
Leatherback turtle, Dermochelys coriacea
Flatback turtle, Natator depressus

See also
Convention on Migratory Species
Sea turtles
Marine Turtles in Africa MoU

References

External links
 Text of the MoU
 IOSEA Marine Turtle Memorandum of Understanding

Convention on the Conservation of Migratory Species of Wild Animals
Sea turtles
Indian Ocean
Environment of Southeast Asia
Treaties concluded in 2001
Treaties entered into force in 2001
Turtle conservation
2001 in the environment
2001 in Germany
Treaties of Australia
Treaties of Bahrain
Treaties of Bangladesh
Treaties of Cambodia
Treaties of the Comoros
Treaties of Eritrea
Treaties of France
Treaties of India
Treaties of Indonesia
Treaties of Iran
Treaties of Jordan
Treaties of Kenya
Treaties of Madagascar
Treaties of Malaysia
Treaties of the Maldives
Treaties of Mauritius
Treaties of Mozambique
Treaties of Myanmar
Treaties of Oman
Treaties of Pakistan
Treaties of Papua New Guinea
Treaties of the Philippines
Treaties of Saudi Arabia
Treaties of Seychelles
Treaties of South Africa
Treaties of Sri Lanka
Treaties of Thailand
Treaties of Tanzania
Treaties of the United Arab Emirates
Treaties of the United Kingdom
Treaties of the United States
Treaties of Vietnam
Treaties of Yemen